Ian Allen may refer to:

Ian Allen (cricketer) (born 1965), West Indian cricketer
Ian Allen (gridiron football) (born 1978), American and Canadian football offensive lineman
Ian Allen (footballer) (1932–2018), Scottish footballer
Ian Allen, member of the band Negativland

See also
Allen (surname)
Ian Allan (disambiguation)